Aliculastrum cylindricum is a species of gastropods belonging to the family Haminoeidae.

The species is found in Indian and Pacific Ocean, Australia.

References

Haminoeidae
Molluscs of Oceania
Gastropods described in 1779